Hydroxylammonium nitrate or hydroxylamine nitrate (HAN) is an inorganic compound with the chemical formula . It is a salt derived from hydroxylamine and nitric acid. In its pure form, it is a colourless hygroscopic solid. It has potential to be used as a rocket propellant either as a solution in monopropellants or bipropellants. Hydroxylammonium nitrate (HAN)-based propellants are a viable and effective solution for future green propellant-based missions, as it offers 50% higher performance for a given propellant tank compared to commercially used hydrazine.

Properties
The compound is a salt with separated hydroxyammonium and nitrate ions. Hydroxylammonium nitrate is unstable because it contains both a reducing agent (hydroxylammonium cation) and an oxidizer (nitrate), the situation being analogous to ammonium nitrate. It is usually handled as an aqueous solution. The solution is corrosive and toxic, and may be carcinogenic. Solid HAN is unstable, especially in the presence of trace amounts of iron(III)).

Laboratory preparatory routes
 Catalytic reduction of nitric oxides
 Double decomposition
 Electrolysis
 Hydrogenation of nitric acid
 Ion exchange via resins
 Neutralization

Applications
HAN has applications as a component of rocket propellant, in both solid and liquid form. HAN and ammonium dinitramide (ADN), another energetic ionic compound, were investigated as less-toxic replacements for toxic hydrazine for monopropellant rockets where only a catalyst is needed to cause decomposition. HAN and ADN will work as monopropellants in water solution, as well as when dissolved with fuel liquids such as methanol.

HAN is used by the Network Centric Airborne Defense Element boost-phase interceptor being developed by Raytheon. As a solid propellant oxidizer, it is typically bonded with glycidyl azide polymer (GAP), hydroxyl-terminated polybutadiene (HTPB), or carboxy-terminated polybutadiene (CTPB) and requires preheating to 200-300 °C to decompose. When used as a monopropellant, the catalyst is a noble metal, similar to the other monopropellants that use silver, palladium, or iridium.

HAN also enabled the development of solid propellants that could be controlled electrically and switched on and off. Developed by DSSP for special effects and microthrusters, these were the first HAN-based propellants in space; and aboard the Naval Research Laboratory SpinSat, launched in 2014.

It will be used in a fuel/oxidizer blend known as "AF-M315E" in the high thrust engines of the Green Propellant Infusion Mission, which was initially expected to be launched in 2015, and eventually launched and deployed on 25 June 2019. The specific impulse of AF-M315E is 257 s.
The aqueous solution of HAN can be added with fuel components such as methanol, glycine, TEAN (tri-ethanol-ammonium nitrate), and amines to form best high performance monopropellants for space propulsion systems.

China Aerospace Science and Technology Corporation (CASC) launched a demonstration of HAN-based thruster aboard a microsatellite in January 2018.

Japanese technology demonstration satellite Innovative Satellite Technology Demonstration-1, launched in January 2019, contains a demonstration thruster using HAN and operated successfully in orbit.

HAN is sometimes used in nuclear reprocessing as a reducing agent for plutonium ions.

Bibliography
Donald G. Harlow et al. (1998). "Technical Report on Hydroxlyamine Nitrate". U.S. Department of Energy. DOE/EH-0555
Gösta Bengtsson et al. (2002) "The kinetics and mechanism of oxidation of hydroxylamine by iron(III)". J. Chem. Soc., Dalton Trans., 2002, 2548–2552

References

Explosive chemicals
Hydroxylammonium compounds
Monopropellants
Nitrates
Rocket fuels